The Passionate Friends is a 1949 British romantic drama film directed by David Lean and starring Ann Todd, Claude Rains and Trevor Howard. The film is based on The Passionate Friends: A Novel (1913) by H. G. Wells. It describes a love triangle in which a woman cannot give up her affair with another man. The film was entered into the 1949 Cannes Film Festival.

Plot

The story is told through episodes of memories by the woman (Mary, played by Ann Todd) while on holiday in Switzerland waiting for her banker husband Howard (Claude Rains) to join her from his business. It has been nine years since they have been on holiday, but also nine years since she last talked to the man she is in love with (Steven, played by Trevor Howard), who unknowing to her has been booked into the adjoining room.

The narrative then goes into the past and tells of the love between Mary and Steven. While Mary loves Steven, she refuses to marry him, believing that a marriage of love would be too stifling, while Steven tells her that two people in love should want to 'belong to each other'. Mary insists that she wants only to 'belong to herself' and runs away as Steven tells her that her life would then be 'a failure'. She then marries Howard, who gives her affection, stability and security. When they meet again nine years later on New Year's Eve, Steven is with his-then girlfriend while Mary is with Howard. Howard dryly pretends not to recognise Steven 'So the enemy wouldn't know he was being observed'.

Steven later pursues Mary again and almost persuades her to change her mind and leave Howard. While Howard accepts his wife's socialising with Steven, he notices they have forgotten their tickets for the theatre. They then lie to him when he inquires of their evening. In a dramatic scene Steven tells Howard Mary is in love with him and Howard should step aside, while Mary asks him to leave so she can talk things over with Howard.

Mary sends Steven a letter, but Steven goes to their residence and demands to see Mary. He sees Howard first, who tells him he knows and understands Mary, while Steven, despite being in love, hardly knows Mary at all. Howard understands that their marriage is not one of love, but one of affection and mutual freedom. Howard is confident that a marriage of love, where partners 'belong' to each other, was not what Mary wants, and all that is needed is for Mary and Steven to stay away from each other. Mary later confirms what Howard said and runs away before Steven can dissuade her.

The narrative returns to the holiday in the Swiss Alps as Mary and Steven innocently meet again. Howard is once more absent due to banking work, and with Steven having a half a day before he has to return to London, they go by boat and cable car to picnic on a mountain. They talk of their lives and Steven reveals that he has two children with his wife. Mary asks him if he is happy, and seems happier herself that he is, but mixed expressions tell of regrets, as if she wishes herself in his wife's place.

When they return from the mountain, Howard has arrived early and happens to see them disembarking the boat together. As he goes to the couple's suite, he notices the porter taking Steven's suitcase from the adjoining room and is filled with suspicion. His pride is further hurt when Mary rushes by him to the terrace, not realising he is there, to wave goodbye enthusiastically to Steven. He storms out when Mary turns and sees him, her feelings revealed on her face, and soon files for divorce against her, alleging adultery.

Mary tries to warn Steven about the divorce action, but he is served with process just as Steven's wife goes to see Steven off a train. Steven's family life is plunged into havoc. Mary decides she must save Steven and, meeting him for the last time, pretends that Howard has withdrawn the divorce, so that Steven can go back to his wife and happy life. She goes to Howard, asking him to stop the divorce by telling him nothing happened in the Swiss hotel and she was innocent of the adjoining room to Steven. Howard then tells her the divorce is not about that. He had not expected love from their marriage, but only affection and some loyalty. Instead he was given 'the love you'd give a dog, the kindness you'd show a beggar, and the loyalty of a bad servant'. Yelling for Mary to get out, he loses his temper and breaks a vase. He quickly calms down and retracts what he said in genuine remorse, revealing that he has developed the very type of romantic love for Mary that he has always disdained, but Mary has already left.

Mary runs from the house and walks through a London Underground station in a trance. Standing on a platform with an incoming train heading West London, she dazedly contemplates the tracks. As the train approaches she draws dangerously close to the platform edge, but just as she is about to leap, someone catches her round the waist. It is Howard (her husband), who has come after her. He holds her as she shakes and the couple reconcile on the platform.

Main cast
 Claude Rains – Howard Justin
 Ann Todd – Mary Justin
 Trevor Howard – Professor Steven Stratton
 Isabel Dean – Pat Stratton
 Betty Ann Davies – Miss Layton

Critical reception
The film received mostly positive reviews, and holds 78% positive reviews on Rotten Tomatoes. Many critics praised its direction, but some criticized it for lacking substance.

References

External links

 
 

1949 films
1949 romantic drama films
British romantic drama films
Films based on works by H. G. Wells
Films directed by David Lean
Films shot at Pinewood Studios
Films produced by Ronald Neame
Films scored by Richard Addinsell
Films based on British novels
1940s English-language films
1940s British films